Frederick George Kellaway PC (3 December 1870 – 13 April 1933), often called F. G. Kellaway, was a Liberal Party politician in the United Kingdom, and Member of Parliament for Bedford from December 1910 to 1922.

Kellaway's father, William Hamley Kellaway, had a joinery and picture frame business in Bristol, where Frederick was born. He became a journalist and then edited a number of local newspapers in Lewisham, before being elected to Parliament in 1910.

Kellaway served as Parliamentary Secretary to the Ministry of Munitions 1916–1920; Secretary for Overseas Trade 1920–1921; and Postmaster General 1921–1922 in the Coalition Government 1916-1922. He was appointed to the Privy Council in the 1920 Birthday Honours.

Following his political career, Kellaway became Managing Director of Marconi.
Kellaway died on 13 April 1933, aged 62, and is buried in St Mary's Churchyard, Tatsfield, Surrey.

References
Obituary, The Times, 15 April 1933

External links 
 

1870 births
1933 deaths
Place of death missing
Politicians from Bristol
Liberal Party (UK) MPs for English constituencies
Members of the Privy Council of the United Kingdom
United Kingdom Postmasters General
UK MPs 1910–1918
UK MPs 1918–1922
English male journalists
English newspaper editors
National Liberal Party (UK, 1922) politicians